Kweller is a surname. Notable people with the surname include:

Ben Kweller (born 1981), American singer, songwriter, and multi-instrumentalist
Ed Kweller (1915–2003), American basketball player

See also
Keller (surname)
Weller